Ludwig Otto Blumenthal (20 July 1876 – 12 November 1944) was a German mathematician and professor at RWTH Aachen University.

Biography
He was born in Frankfurt, Hesse-Nassau. A student of David Hilbert, Blumenthal was an editor of Mathematische Annalen. When the Civil Service Act of 1933 became law in 1933, after Hitler became Chancellor, Blumenthal was dismissed from his position at RWTH Aachen University. He was married to Amalie Ebstein, also known as 'Mali' and daughter of Wilhelm Ebstein.

Blumenthal, who was of Jewish background, emigrated from Nazi Germany to the Netherlands, lived in Utrecht and was deported via Westerbork to the concentration camp, Theresienstadt in Bohemia (now Czech Republic), where he died.

In 1913, Blumenthal made a fundamental, though often overlooked, contribution to applied mathematics and aerodynamics by building on Joukowsky's work to extract the complex transformation that carries the latter's name, making it an example of Stigler's Law.

Selected publications

References

External links

 

1876 births
1944 deaths
19th-century German mathematicians
20th-century German mathematicians
German Jews who died in the Holocaust
Scientists from Frankfurt
People from Hesse-Nassau
University of Göttingen alumni
Academic staff of the University of Göttingen
Academic staff of the University of Marburg
Academic staff of RWTH Aachen University
German people who died in the Theresienstadt Ghetto
Jewish emigrants from Nazi Germany to the Netherlands
People dismissed from faculty positions by Nazi Germany